Lady Soul is the third studio album by Japanese singer-songwriter Aco. It was released via Ki/oon Records on September 19, 1998. It peaked at number 33 on the Oricon Albums Chart.

Track listing

Charts

References

External links 
 

1998 albums
Aco (musician) albums
Ki/oon Records albums